Merini is an Italian surname. Notable people with the surname include:

Alda Merini (1931–2009), Italian writer and poet
Matteo Merini (born 1988), Italian footballer

See also
Merino (surname)

Italian-language surnames